Super Concert '70 was a one-day music festival held at the Deutschlandhalle in Berlin, Germany, on September 4, 1970. Headlined by Jimi Hendrix, the bill also featured Cat Mother & the All Night Newsboys, Procol Harum, Ten Years After, and Canned Heat, whose harmonica/guitar player and singer, Alan "Blind Owl" Wilson, had died the day before.

This was Hendrix's second-to-last performance; his final appearance on stage came two days later, at the Open Air Love & Peace Festival in Fehmarn, Germany.

See also

List of historic rock festivals
List of music festivals

References

1970 in Germany
Rock festivals in Germany
Music festivals established in 1970
1970 music festivals